The Turf Club was the regulatory body for horse racing in Ireland until 31 December 2017.

History 
The origin of the Turf Club was a regulatory body known as the Society of Sportsmen, which became The Jockey Club by 1755, before taking on its present name of the Turf Club in 1784. Despite being independent of the English Jockey Club, it did on occasion referred disputes to that organisation. A similar body for National Hunt races, the Irish National Hunt Steeplechase Committee, was later formed under the Turf Club to ensure fair running of National Hunt meetings.

Activities 
The Turf Club regulated both Flat and National Hunt racing in Ireland. It incorporated the Irish National Hunt Steeplechase Committee (INHSC). One of the main functions of the club was the provision of stewards to implement Rules of Racing during races. Its remit includes both the Republic of Ireland and Northern Ireland, and it has members on the board of Horse Racing Ireland. The Turf Club's regulatory work was transferred to a new limited liability company, the Irish Horseracing Regulatory Board, from 1 January 2018.

See also 
 Horse Racing Ireland
 Horse racing in Ireland

Notes

References

External links 
 

Horse racing organizations
Horse racing in Ireland